Bendamurlanka is a village in Allavaram Mandal in East Godavari District in Andhra Pradesh State in India.

Geography
It is surrounded by the river Godavari on one side and Bay of Bengal sea on the other direction.

References

Villages in East Godavari district